John James Taylor (12 October 1928 – February 2016) was an English professional footballer who played as a right winger.

Career
Born in Manchester, Taylor played for Blackpool, Accrington Stanley and Stalybridge Celtic.

References

1928 births
2016 deaths
English footballers
Blackpool F.C. players
Accrington Stanley F.C. (1891) players
Stalybridge Celtic F.C. players
English Football League players
Association football wingers